The Dead Lands is a Māori language horror television series based on the film of the same name. In 2019, AMC Entertainment's streaming service Shudder and TVNZ said they would create a TV series based on the film The Dead Lands. The first two episodes of The Dead Lands premiered on 23 January 2020 on Shudder's platforms. It also aired on TVNZ OnDemand in New Zealand immediately after its international debut. Subsequent episodes premiered on both Shudder and TVNZ OnDemand weekly.

Cast 
Darneen Christian as Mehe
Te Kohe Tuhaka as Waka Nuku Rau
Jordi Webber as Rangi

Episodes

See also
 The Dead Lands

References

External links
 

Works about Māori people
2020s horror television series
New Zealand drama television series
2020 New Zealand television series debuts
Shudder (streaming service) original programming
Māori-language mass media